Fábio Leandro Barbosa (born 5 December 1978 in Brazil), sometimes known as just Fábio or Fabinho, is a Brazilian professional footballer who last played for Negeri Sembilan in Malaysia, as a striker.

Club career

Negeri Sembilan 
Fabio made his debut with Negeri playing against LionsXII on 13 April 2013. He scored 1 goal during that match that ended draw 1–1. During 2013 Malaysia Cup playoff playing against Sabah Fabio scored 1 goal in the match that  ended his team won, 4–0. He also scored the opening goal in his team Negeri Sembilan's 2–0 win over Terengganu at the Sultan Ismail Nasiruddin Shah Stadium in the 2013 Malaysia Cup Match on the 20 August 2013. He later fired in the equaliser in Negeri Sembilan's 1-1 draw with Kelantan cancelling Dickson Nwakaeme's early strike at the Tuanku Abdul Rahman Stadium in Paroi and hit a brace in Negeri Sembilan's shocking 3-2 upset win against the same opponents Kelantan at the Sultan Mohamed IV Stadium in Kota Bharu. He is therefore nicknamed the "BRAZILIAN HITMAN" and forged a lethal partnership with Malaysian International S.Sivanesan who have scored a total of nine goals in 4 matches in the 2013 Malaysia Cup between them.

References

External links
 
 Fabio Leandro Barbosa Profile at Stadium Astro

1978 births
Living people
Brazilian footballers
Association football forwards
Estrela do Norte Futebol Clube players
Negeri Sembilan FA players
Brazilian expatriate footballers
Expatriate footballers in Malaysia
Brazilian expatriate sportspeople in Malaysia